A Memory Like You is the seventh studio album by American actor and country music artist John Schneider. It was released December 1985 via MCA Records. The album peaked at number 1 on the Billboard Top Country Albums chart.

Track listing

Personnel
 Matt Betton – drums
 Larry Byrom – electric guitar
 John Catchings – cello
 Ralph Childs – tuba
 Sonny Curtis – acoustic guitar on "Old Rainbow Jukebox and You"
 Thom Flora – background vocals
 Emory Gordy, Jr. – bass guitar
 Barry Green – trombone
 John Barlow Jarvis – keyboards
 Sam Levine – clarinet
 Michael Lunn – background vocals
 Terry Mead – trumpet
 Farrell Morris – percussion
 John Schneider – lead vocals, background vocals
 Lisa Silver – violin
 Billy Joe Walker, Jr. – acoustic guitar
 Curtis Young - background vocals 
 Reggie Young – electric guitar

Charts

Weekly charts

Year-end charts

References

1985 albums
John Schneider (screen actor) albums
MCA Records albums
Albums produced by Jimmy Bowen